Does My Head Look Big In This? is author Randa Abdel-Fattah's first novel. It was released in Australia, by Pan MacMillan Australia, on 1 August 2005. It won the Australian Book Industry Award and Australian Book of The Year Award for older children.

The story revolves around (and is told from the view point of) a sixteen-year-old Muslim girl who decides to wear the hijab, a religious veil, full-time. Her decision leads to different reactions from her friends, family, and peers.

This novel was adapted as a full-length play and is available from the Dramatic Publishing Company.

Characters
Amal Mohamed Nasrullah Abdel-Hakim is the main protagonist of the story. She is a sixteen-year-old Australian Palestinian-Muslim girl with green-blue eyes and light brown hair. Amal is deeply religious and very respectful of her family and elders. While watching a Friends rerun, Amal is inspired by Rachel Green to wear the hijab as an act of responsibility and courage. Amal has strong feelings for Adam Keane, but puts her religion before her heart when he tries to kiss her at his birthday party.
Leila Okulgen is one of Amal's friends. She is seventeen years old and is a Turkish Muslim girl with dark brown hair, and deep brown eyes. Leila has a brother named Hakan who is deeply disrespectful of his parents and is extremely sexist towards his sister. She wears the hijab as a "full-timer", like Amal.
Yasmeen Khan is Amal's friend. She is sixteen years old and is an Australian Muslim of Pakistani and British descent with curly brown hair and brown eyes. Yasmeen has white skin with a ton of freckles. When in public, Yasmeen likes to pretend her name is Jasmine because she "thinks it's more exotic". Yasmeen doesn't wear the hijab full-time, and attends a public high school with Leila.
 Mrs. Vaselli is Amal's Greek neighbor. Originally portrayed as a grumpy old lady who Amal dislikes, she and Amal eventually connect over their stories about family and life as an immigrant.
Simone is Amal's friend. She is sixteen years old and is a natural blonde. Since she is slightly overweight, Simone tries many fad diets, and is constantly bullied by Tia about her weight. Simone gets discouraged easily, and has a low self-esteem. She forms a romantic relationship with Josh.
Eileen Tanaka is Amal's friend. She is a sixteen-year-old Japanese girl. Eileen previously studied Japanese dance, and is interested in a creative arts degree, much to her parents' dismay. Unlike Simone and Amal, Eileen never comes close to having a romantic relationship.
Adam Keane is Amal's crush, chemistry partner, and one of her close friends. Adam attempts to kiss Amal at his birthday party, but she rejects his advances, choosing to stand by her religion. This ends their flirtation, but after Leila runs away, they begin to rebuild their friendship.
Josh Goldberg is Simone's love interest. He is Jewish and supports Amal when she starts wearing a hijab.
Tia Tamos is an antagonist and the school bully. Although she is "gorgeous", she is haughty and hypocritical. Tia is a prejudiced racist who constantly makes rude comments about Simone's weight, Eileen's heritage, and Amal's religion. She has a crush on Josh, much to his disgust.
Claire Foster and Rita Mason are Tia's followers, who abide by everything she says and does.
Uncle Joe is Amal's maternal uncle and was born "Ismail". He does not follow his religion, and tries his best to become fully "Aussie".
Aunt Mandy is Joe's wife and Amal's aunt. Like her husband, she does not follow her religion.
Samantha is Amal's cousin and one of the few extended family members Amal trusts and enjoys talking to.
George is Amal's younger cousin. He is the son of Joe and Mandy, and is considered a pest by both Amal and Samantha.
Hakan is Leila's older brother, who prefers to be known as Sam. He dislikes Leila and is verbally abusive towards her.

References

2005 Australian novels
Australian children's novels
Australian young adult novels
Novels set in Melbourne
2005 children's books